This is a list of notable singers who have performed in the Afrikaans language. Solo artists are alphabetised by their stage name or surname—whichever is more common. Choirs that sing in Afrikaans are also included in the list, but other music groups are listed in the "Music groups" section below.

The first major South African singers to record in Afrikaans were Ada Forrest and Annie Visser, in 1908.

A
Andriëtte
Anke

B
 Bok van Blerk
 Cristina Boshoff
 Piet Botha
 Bles Bridges
 Liza Brönner

C

 Arno Carstens
 Chris Chameleon
 Mimi Coertse

D
 Kurt Darren
 Izak Davel
 Al Debbo
 Coenie de Villiers
 Casper de Vries
 Ray Dylan

E
 Erica Eloff
 Jurie Els
 Elvis Blue

F
 Joanna Field
 Ada Forrest

G
 Anton Goosen

H
Sonja Herholdt
Steve Hofmeyr

J

 Hennie Jacobs
 Fanie de Jager
 Lance James
 Watkin Tudor Jones
 Arno Jordaan
 Theuns Jordaan

K
 Ada Cherry Kearton (married name of Ada Forrest)
 Johannes Kerkorrel
 Koos Kombuis
 Gé Korsten
 Karin Kortje
 David Kramer

L
 Riku Lätti
 Patricia Lewis
 Nicholis Louw
 Stefan Ludik
 Laura Lynn
 Helmut Lotti

N
 Nádine 
 Nataniël
 Riana Nel
Ricus Nel
 Nianell

O

 Overtone

P
 Jack Parow
 Brendan Peyper
 Juanita du Plessis
 Koos du Plessis
 Gert Potgieter

R
 Laurika Rauch

S
Leon Schuster
Snotkop
 Etienne Steyn
 Amanda Strydom
 Valiant Swart

T
 Shaun Tait
 Adam Tas

V
 Bobby van Jaarsveld

 Piet van Wyk de Vries
 Yolandi Visser
 Amor Vittone
 Francois Van Coke; also the lead singer of punk rock bands Van Coke Kartel and Fokofpolisiekar (listed below)

W
 Willim Welsyn
 Robbie Wessels
 Heinz Winckler
 Dana Winner

Z

 Karen Zoid

Music groups that perform in Afrikaans

See also
 List of Dutch musicians
 List of South African musicians
 Music of Namibia
 Music of the Netherlands
 Music of South Africa

References

 
Lists of people by language
Lists of singers by language
Lists of mass media in South Africa
Singers, Afrikaans
 
South African music-related lists